The 2007 US Open women's doubles tennis tournament was held from 27 August to 9 September 2007, at USTA Billie Jean King National Tennis Center at Flushing Meadows, New York City. The  event was won by first-time pairings Nathalie Dechy and Dinara Safina.

Seeds

Draw

Finals

Top half

Section 1

Section 2

Bottom half

Section 3

Section 4

See also
List of tennis tournaments

References

External links 
 Draws
2007 US Open – Women's draws and results at the International Tennis Federation

Women's Doubles
US Open (tennis) by year – Women's doubles
2007 in women's tennis
2007 in American women's sports